And Love Said No: The Greatest Hits 1997–2004 is a greatest hits compilation by Finnish rock band HIM. It contains two new Tim Palmer produced songs, "And Love Said No" and "Solitary Man", the latter of which is a Neil Diamond cover. The British version also has a re-recorded version of "It's All Tears (Drown in This Love)". The digipak version of this album comes with a DVD with six songs live at Semifinal Club in Helsinki.

Track listing 
"And Love Said No" – 4:10
"Join Me" – 3:37
"Buried Alive by Love" – 5:01
"Heartache Every Moment" – 3:56
"Solitary Man" (Neil Diamond cover) – 3:36
"Right Here in My Arms" – 4:00
"The Funeral of Hearts" – 4:29
"In Joy and Sorrow" – 3:59
"Your Sweet 666" (re-recorded version) – 3:56
"Gone with the Sin" – 4:22
"Wicked Game" (Chris Isaak cover) (re-recorded version) – 4:04
"The Sacrament" – 4:30
"Close to the Flame" – 3:47
"It's All Tears (Drown in This Love)" (re-recorded version) – 4:30*
"Poison Girl" – 3:51
"Pretending" – 3:41
"When Love and Death Embrace" – 6:08
"Website extras included as Enhanced CD content
* – Only available on the UK version. Other versions omit this track completely.

Bonus DVD: Live at the Semifinal in Helsinki (24–30 April 2003) 
"Soul on Fire" – 4:09
"The Funeral of Hearts" – 4:44
"Beyond Redemption" – 4:23
"Sweet Pandemonium" – 5:07
"Buried Alive by Love" – 4:48
"The Sacrament" – 4:34

Box-set LP 

The And Love Said No box set LP contained the band's first four studio albums on vinyl along with the "Wicked Game" single.

B-sides (only singles) 
"And Love Said No" (radio edit) – 3:42
"It's All Tears (Drown in This Love)" (live, Semifinal Club, Helsinki, Finland 24/04 – 30 April 2003) – 3:50
"Pretending" (live) – 4:45
"Please Don't Let It Go" (live)
"Join Me in Death" (live)
"Your Sweet 666" (live)

Charts

Certifications

References 

2004 greatest hits albums
HIM (Finnish band) compilation albums
Albums produced by John Fryer (producer)
Albums produced by Tim Palmer
Albums produced by Kevin Shirley